FIS (International Ski Federation) World Cup may refer to:

FIS Alpine Ski World Cup, annual circuit of international alpine skiing competitions
FIS Cross-Country World Cup, annual circuit of international cross-country skiing competitions
FIS Freestyle Skiing World Cup, annual international freestyle skiing competition circuit
FIS Nordic Combined World Cup, annual international Nordic combined competition circuit
FIS Ski Jumping World Cup, annual international ski jumping competition circuit
FIS Ski Flying World Cup, annual ski flying competitions, part of the FIS Ski Jumping World Cup
FIS Snowboard World Cup, annual international snowboarding competition circuit
FIS Speed Ski World Cup, annual speed skiing competitions
FIS Telemark World Cup, annual Telemark racing competitions
FIS Grass Skiing World Cup, annual grass skiing competitions